James Hanley may refer to:
 James Hanley (painter) (born 1965), Irish painter
 James Hanley (novelist) (1897–1985), British novelist and playwright
 James Hanley (hurler) (1877–1915), Irish hurler
 James F. Hanley (1892–1942), American songwriter
 James M. Hanley (1920–2003), American politician
 Jim Hanley (1885–1961), Major League Baseball pitcher
 James Hanley (California politician) (1847–1916), Los Angeles, California, railroad man and politician